Professor Alfred Stengel (1868–1939) was an American surgeon, born in Lancaster County, Pennsylvania. He was President of the American College of Physicians and Clinical Professor of Medicine at Women's Medical College of Pennsylvania.

Stengel was born in Pittsburgh, the son of Gottfried Stengel, in 1868. In 1889, whilst studying, he and a group of students commissioned Thomas Eakins to paint The Agnew Clinic. Stengel can be found in the center of the portrait.

References

1868 births
1939 deaths
Physicians from Philadelphia
American surgeons
University of Pennsylvania faculty
Perelman School of Medicine at the University of Pennsylvania alumni